North Leeton is a locality in the northern part of the suburb Leeton, New South Wales in Leeton Shire. It is the most rapidly growing area of Leeton with many housing estates such as Karri Estate and Nobel Park Estate being constructed to meet housing demands. Brobenah Road is the main road passing through the area and such facilities as ABC Leeton North, a supermarket, Assumption Villa Retirement Village, Salvation Army Centre and the Brobenah Home Centre are located along the road.

See also
 Leeton

Suburbs of Leeton, New South Wales